The Vancouver Film and Television Forum is an annual event produced by the Vancouver International Film Festival in Vancouver, British Columbia, Canada. Now in its 28th year, the Film and Television Forum takes place at the Rogers Industry Centre located at the Vancouver International Film Centre from October 2–4, 2013 with New Filmmakers' Day (NFD) on October 5.

Overview 
The Forum is a four-day event that features panel discussions, master classes, workshops, and meetings geared to the professional development of the Canadian film and television community. It also serves as a platform for delegates to access domestic and global market leaders, share the expertise of international speakers and meet and foster working relationships with their peers.

Program content includes discussions ranging from the issue of multiplatform production and digital distribution to finding elusive co-production partners. Each day focuses on a different aspect of the industry, with themes including documentaries, factual programming, films, television and "new filmmakers". Speakers focus on successful and critically acclaimed film and television productions. Guest speakers have included Marc Forster, Atom Egoyan, Peter Farrelly, Sarah Polley, Stan Lee, Conrad Hall, Doug Liman, Michael Moore, Alexander Payne, Gus Van Sant and Joel H. Cohen.

See also
Vancouver International Film Festival

External links 
 Official website

Events in Vancouver
Cinema of British Columbia
Film organizations in Canada